Yevgeni Vasilyevich Sidorov (born May 3, 1956 in Moscow) is a retired Soviet and Russian football player and a current manager.

Honours
 Soviet Top League winner: 1979.
 Soviet Top League runner-up: 1980, 1981, 1984, 1985.

International career
Sidorov played his only game for USSR on March 26, 1980 in a friendly against Bulgaria.

References
  Profile

1956 births
Living people
Soviet footballers
Soviet Union international footballers
Russian footballers
Russian football managers
FC Spartak Moscow players
FC SKA Rostov-on-Don players
FC Tyumen players
FC APK Morozovsk players
Soviet Top League players

Association football midfielders